Redha Malek (21 December 1931 – 29 July 2017) was an Algerian politician who served as Prime Minister of Algeria from 21 August 1993 to April 1994. During his short term of office, which came in the early years of the Algerian Civil War, he pursued a hardline anti-Islamist policy and successfully negotiated debt relief with the International Monetary Fund (IMF), following the implementation of an IMF reform plan.

Biography 
He was born in Batna on 21 December 1931 and was editor of the FLN newspaper El Moudjahid between 1957 and 1962, during the Algerian War of Independence (1954–62). After 1963, he was sent as ambassador to Yugoslavia, France, the Soviet Union, the United States (1979–82), and the United Kingdom; he also briefly became Minister of Information and Culture (1977–79) and later Foreign Minister (3 February – 21 August 1993). He later became head of the a minor political party, the National Republican Alliance (ANR), founded on 5 May 1995 shortly after a presidential election.

He died on 29 July 2017, at the age of 85 after a long illness.

Books
;

References

1931 births
2017 deaths
People from Batna, Algeria
National Liberation Front (Algeria) politicians
National Republican Alliance politicians
Culture ministers of Algeria
Ambassadors of Algeria to France
Ambassadors of Algeria to the Soviet Union
Ambassadors of Algeria to Yugoslavia
Ambassadors of Algeria to the United Kingdom
Ambassadors of Algeria to the United States
Foreign ministers of Algeria
21st-century Algerian people